Monochroa ainella is a moth of the family Gelechiidae. It was described by Pierre Chrétien in 1908. It is found in Algeria.

The wingspan is 10–13 mm. The forewings are ochreous yellow. The hindwings are grey.

References

Moths described in 1908
Monochroa